USS Alpaco was a cargo ship that served in the United States Navy from November to December 1918.

SS Alpaco was built in 1918 as a wooden-hulled commercial cargo ship by the Hodge Shipbuilding Company at Moss Point, Mississippi, for the United States Shipping Board. Upon completion, she was transferred to the U.S. Navy, which took possession of her on 18 November 1918 and  commissioned her the same day as USS Alpaco at the Navy Yard Dock in New Orleans, Louisiana. She was never given a naval registry identification number, but was assigned to the Naval Overseas Transportation Service and earmarked for coastwise service.

The Navy conducted sea trials of Alpaco on 3 December 1918 with representatives of Hodge Shipbuilding on board. She was unable to maintain maximum revolutions for her engines, and a fire broke out in a coal bunker that took a little over 45 minutes to extinguish, the firefighters having to rip off the galvanized sheet iron from the engine room bulkhead to enable them to use their hoses to better advantage. Alpaco had to be assisted back into her berth by the tug .

Condemned as "unseaworthy" after this fiasco, Alpaco remained pierside at her berth until decommissioned there on 19 December 1918 and simultaneously returned to the U.S. Shipping Board. As SS Alpaco, she remained in the Shipping Boards hands until she was scrapped by mid-1924.

References

Department of the Navy: Naval Historical Center Online Library of Selected Images: U.S. Navy Ships: USS Alpaco (1918–1918). Originally, and later, the civilian steamship Alpaco.
NavSource Online: Section Patrol Craft Photo Archive: Alpaco

 

Ships built in Moss Point, Mississippi
1918 ships
Auxiliary ships of the United States Navy